Downham  is a village and civil parish in Lancashire, England. It is in the Ribble Valley district and at the United Kingdom 2001 census had a population of 156. The 2011 Census includes neighbouring Twiston giving a total for both parishes of 214. Much of the parish, including the village is part of the Forest of Bowland Area of Outstanding Natural Beauty (AONB). It adjoins the Ribble Valley parishes of Rimington, Twiston, Worston, Chatburn and Sawley, and the Pendle parish of Barley-with-Wheatley Booth.

History
The manor was originally granted to the de Dinelay family in the fourteenth century by Henry of Grosmont, 1st Duke of Lancaster.  It ceased to be a part of the Honour of Clitheroe in 1558 when it was purchased by the Assheton family.  It still remains in Assheton ownership today but was reincorporated into the Honour of Clitheroe in 1945 when Ralph Assheton, later 1st Baron Clitheroe, bought the remnants of the Honour from the administrators of the Clitheroe Estate Company.

The 2nd Lord Clitheroe does not allow overhead electricity lines, aerials or satellite dishes, making the village a popular location for filming period dramas. Downham was one of the locations used in the 1961 film Whistle Down the Wind, and the BBC One series Born and Bred, set in the fictional village of Ormston, was also filmed in the village. The 2012 BBC drama The Secret Of Crickley Hall was also filmed in and around Downham.

Governance
Downham was once a township in the ancient parish of Whalley. This became a civil parish in 1866, forming part of the Clitheroe Rural District from 1894 till 1974.

Along with Chatburn and Twiston, the parish makes up the Chatburn ward of Ribble Valley Borough Council.

Media gallery

See also

 Assheton baronets
 Honour of Clitheroe
 Listed buildings in Downham, Lancashire

References

External links

Downham Parish Meeting (Lancashire Parish Portal)
Walk: Downham - Pendle Hill, The Pennines, Lancashire (The Guardian)
Downham Conservation Area Appraisal
Downham search results at Historic England's Pastscape site
pp552-58 of The Victoria History of the County of Lancaster Vol 6

Villages in Lancashire
Civil parishes in Lancashire
Geography of Ribble Valley
Forest of Bowland